In software development, CruiseControl is a Java-based framework for a continuous build process. It includes, but is not limited to, plugins for email notification, Ant, and various source control tools. A web interface is provided to view the details of the current and previous builds.  It allows one to perform a continuous integration of any software development process.

CruiseControl is free, open-source software, distributed under a BSD-style license. It was one of the first of its kind of software, originally created by employees of ThoughtWorks to allow for continuous integration on a project they were working on. It was later extracted into a stand-alone application.

There is a version of CruiseControl for .NET called CruiseControl.NET (aka CCNet) and a version for Ruby called CruiseControl.rb.

The current version is 2.8.4, released in 2010.

Build loop
The build loop is designed to run as a daemon process, which periodically checks the revision control system for changes to the codebase, builds if necessary, and publishes a notice regarding the status of the software build.

Build reporting
CruiseControl provides two ways of reporting build status. The first (classic) reporting is the reporting JSP and the second is the dashboard.

Results JSP
The build reporting is designed to present the results of the CruiseControl build loop. It is based on a HTML report managed by a JSP page. The left side of the page displays whether CruiseControl is currently building a project, and provides links to the details of previous builds. The right side of the page presents the results of the build—including compilation errors, test results and details about what files have changed since the last build.

Dashboard
The dashboard was introduced in the 2.7 release. The dashboard is a web page to enable visualising the project build statuses. Previous project build results are colour-coded providing a snapshot of how the projects are doing at that moment. Users can hover the cursor over icons to see the name and information about the project.
The 'Builds' tab of the dashboard shows all projects (colour-coded) sorted by name providing some more information.

References

External links
Official CruiseControl homepage
Continuous Integration by Martin Fowler and Matthew Foemmel
Introduction to CruiseControl (slide show)
CruiseControl for .NET
CruiseControl for Ruby 
Integrating Lava Lamps to CruiseControl by Pak-Tjun Chin
Big Visible Cruise Web Build Monitor

Compiling tools
Java development tools
Continuous integration
Software using the BSD license
Discontinued development tools